The Sydney Bulls were a rugby league team based in the suburb of Bass Hill in south-western Sydney.  Founded in 1999, the club was formed by Lebanese-Australian players and businessmen who were involved in the 1997 Lebanon Rugby League World Sevens side. Since 2000, the Bulls competed in the semi-professional Metropolitan Cup and, since its inception in 2003, the NSWRL Jim Beam Cup competition in NSW, Australia. Their colours are black, white green and red. They were included in the NSW Cup for 2009 and acted as a feeder club for the Canterbury-Bankstown Bulldogs under the name of the Bankstown City Bulls. The Sydney Bulls folded at the end of the 2009 season.

Metropolitan Cup/NSWRL Jim Beam Cup

The Bulls found success early in their history winning the last Metropolitan Cup in their third season, 2002.

Since the competition was reorganised into the NSWRL Jim Beam Cup in 2003 the Bulls have appeared in four of the five Grand Finals, winning in both 2004 (defeating defending premiers The Entrance Tigers) and 2006 (defeating Newtown Jets). In 2005 the Bulls were defeated by Windsor Wolves in the season decider, and in 2007 30-20 by The Entrance Tigers. The Sydney Bulls folded at the end of the 2009 season.

See also

References

External links
 Ron Massey Cup Site
 Sydney Bulls Official Site

1999 establishments in Australia
City of Canterbury-Bankstown
Defunct rugby league teams in Australia
Ron Massey Cup
Rugby clubs established in 1999
Rugby league teams in Sydney